O Primeiro Amor is a Brazilian telenovela produced and broadcast by TV Globo. It premiered on 24 January 1972 and ended on 20 October 1972, with a total of 227 episodes. It is the tenth "novela das sete" to be aired at the timeslot. It was created by Walter Negrão and directed by Régis Cardoso with Walter Campos.

Cast

References

External links 
 

1972 telenovelas
TV Globo telenovelas
Brazilian telenovelas
1972 Brazilian television series debuts
1972 Brazilian television series endings
Portuguese-language telenovelas